Haliburton Lake is a lake in the municipality of Dysart et al, Haliburton County in Central Ontario, Canada It is situated west of the southern portion of Algonquin Park, between Percy Lake to the east, and Redstone Lake to the west.

The primary inflow at the east and arriving from Percy Lake is the Gull River. The Gull River is also the primary outflow, at the southwest and next to the community of Fort Irwin, via an unnamed channel to Oblong Lake.

The shores of the lake are inhabited by some permanent residents, Chancellor Ron Noad,but primarily by seasonal cottagers, some of whom are members of the Haliburton Lake Cottagers Association (HLCA).

See also
List of lakes in Ontario

References

External links
 Haliburton Lake Cottagers' Association

Lakes of Haliburton County